Samia or Samiyah (Arabic: سامية sāmiyah), also spelt Samiya, Sameea, is an Arabic female given name meaning “elevated, exalted, lofty”, “high of prominence, eminence, glory, distinction”, “aspiring to the highest distinction, honour, sublime, proud, noble-minded of ethics and morals”. The name is considered as one of the most popular names in the Arab world amongst females.

The female given name Samya (Arabic: سَمْياء samyā’ ), which is a variant of the name Samiya bears the same meaning perhaps taken from the sky.

The female given name Samiya which its written form stems from the male given name, Sami (Arabic: سامي samī).

Samiya may also refer to:

Given Name 
 Samia Abbou, Tunisian lawyer and politician
 Samia al-Aghbari, Yemeni blogger
 Samia Ahad, Palestinian chef
 Samia Ahmed, Egyptian synchronized swimmer
 Samia Akario, Moroccan actress and director
 Samia Amin, Egyptian actress
 Samia al-Amoudi, Saudi physician
 Samiya Bashir, American poet and author
 Samia Benameur, Algerian author under the pen name Maïssa Bey
 Sâmia Bomfim, Brazilian politician
 Samia Doumit, better known as Sam Doumit, American actress
 Samia Usman Fatah, Pakistani politician
 Samia Finnerty (Samia (musician)), American singer-songwriter
 Samia Gamal, Egyptian belly dancer and actress
 Samia Ghali, French politician
 Samia Gore, American author and entrepreneur
 Samia Hachemi, Algerian judoka
 Samia Halaby, Palestinian-American artist
 Samia Suluhu Hassan, Tanzanian politician
 Samia Hireche, Algerian rower
 Samia Khan, Pakistani-American news personality
 Sâmia Lima, Brazilian badminton player
 Samia Longchambon, English actress
 Samia Medjahdi, Algerian tennis player
 Samia Mehrez, Egyptian professor
 Samiya Mumtaz, Pakistani actress
 Samia Nkrumah, Ghanaian politician
 Samia Yusuf Omar, Somali sprinter
 Samiya Rafiq, Pakistani trekker
 Samia Said, Bangladeshi model and actress
 Samia Sarwar, Pakistani murder victim
 Samia Sehabi, Algerian handball player
 Samia Shoaib, Pakistani-American writer and actress
 Samia Zaman, Bangladeshi media personality

Surname 
 Dru Samia, American football player
 Frank Samia, Australian rugby player
 Maoz Samia, Israeli footballer
 Yom-Tov Samia, Israeli general

Other 
 Samiya, an ancient sea temple in the film Pokémon Ranger and the Temple of the Sea

Arabic feminine given names
Arabic-language surnames